Pedro dos Santos Pereira (born 28 July 1978, in Lisbon) is a Portuguese retired footballer who played mainly as a defender.

External links

1978 births
Living people
Footballers from Lisbon
Portuguese footballers
Association football defenders
Segunda Divisão players
C.D. Olivais e Moscavide players
Seixal F.C. players
Real S.C. players
Imortal D.C. players
Atlético Clube de Portugal players
Juventude Sport Clube players
Doxa Katokopias FC players
Atromitos Yeroskipou players
S.U. Sintrense players
Cypriot First Division players
Portuguese expatriate footballers
Expatriate footballers in Cyprus
Portuguese expatriate sportspeople in Cyprus